Omega Eridani (ω Eri) is a binary star system in the constellation Eridanus. It is visible to the naked eye with an apparent visual magnitude is 4.37. The distance to this star, as determined by the parallax method, is around 235 light years.

This is a single-lined spectroscopic binary system with an orbital period of 3,057 days (8.4 years) and an eccentricity of 0.46. The primary component is an A-type subgiant star with a stellar classification of A9 IVn, where the 'n' suffix indicates a broad ("nebulous") absorption due to rotation. The projected rotational velocity is 186 km/s. This is giving the star an oblate shape with an equator that is 13% wider than the polar radius. The angular size of Omega Eridani is 0.87 mas. At an estimated distance of the star, this yields a physical size of around 6.7 times the radius of the Sun.

References

A-type subgiants
Eridanus (constellation)
Eridani, Omega
Eridani, 61
031109
022701
01560
Durchmusterung objects
Spectroscopic binaries